Leikong is a village in Herøy Municipality in Møre og Romsdal county, Norway.  The village is located on the eastern side of the island of Gurskøya.  Historically, Leikong has been a regional centre for trade.  It is located along a main road on the island of Gurskøya, but it is also located along the confluence of several fjords: Vartdalsfjorden, Voldsfjorden, Ørstafjorden, and Rovdefjorden.  The village is home to Leikanger Church. 

References

Villages in Møre og Romsdal
Herøy, Møre og Romsdal